Santos Vega is a 1917 Argentine silent historical film directed by Carlos de Paoli. It is based on the story of the legendary gaucho Santos Vega.

Cast
 José Juan Podestá as Santos Vega  
 Ignacio Corsini

References

Bibliography 
 Finkielman, Jorge. The Film Industry in Argentina: An Illustrated Cultural History. McFarland, 2003.

External links 
 

1917 films
Argentine silent films
Argentine historical films
1910s historical films
1910s Spanish-language films
Argentine black-and-white films